Major League Soccer owners own a share in the league and are granted right to operate a team. Major League Soccer (MLS) operates under a single-entity structure in which teams and player contracts are centrally owned by the league. Each MLS team has an investor-operator that is a shareholder in the league. In order to control costs, the league shares revenues and holds players contracts instead of players contracting with individual teams.

The league has 30 investor-operators for its 28 current and 1 future team. AEG, which at one time invested in six clubs, solely operates one team (LA Galaxy). Lamar Hunt used to operate multiple teams, but now Hunt Sports only operates one team (FC Dallas). Two of the league's teams are operated, at least in part, by neither Americans nor Canadians — Austrian Dietrich Mateschitz (New York Red Bulls), and Indonesian Erick Thohir (D.C. United).

History
Having multiple clubs operated by a single investor was a necessity in the league's first ten years. At one time Phil Anschutz's AEG operated six MLS clubs, and Lamar Hunt's Hunt Sports operated three teams. In order to attract additional investors, in 2002 the league announced changes to the operating agreement between the league and its teams to improve team revenues and increase the incentives to be an individual team operator. These changes included granting operators the rights to a certain number of players they develop through their teams's academy system each year, sharing the profits of Soccer United Marketing, and being able to sell individual team jersey sponsorships.

As MLS appeared to be on the brink of overall profitability in 2006 and developed significant expansion plans, MLS announced that it wanted each team to have a distinct operator. The league has attracted new investors that have injected more money into the operation. Examples include Red Bull's purchase of the operation rights of the MetroStars from AEG in 2006 for over $100 million.

Fraser
In Fraser v. Major League Soccer, a lawsuit filed in 1996 and decided in 2002, the league won a legal battle with its players in which the court ruled that MLS was a single entity that can lawfully centrally contract for player services. The court also ruled that even absent their collective bargaining agreement, players could opt to play in other leagues if they were unsatisfied.

List of MLS operators by team

Austin FC
Anthony Precourt (Two Oak Ventures LLC) (2018–present)

Atlanta United FC
Arthur Blank (2014–present)

Charlotte FC
David Tepper (2019–present)

Chicago Fire
Anschutz Entertainment Group (1997–2007)
Andrew Hauptman (Andell Holdings) (2007–2019)
Joe Mansueto (2019–present)

Colorado Rapids
Anschutz Entertainment Group (1995–2003)
Kroenke Sports & Entertainment (2003–present)

Columbus Crew
Lamar Hunt (1995–2006)
Clark Hunt (2006–2013)
Anthony Precourt (Precourt Sports Ventures LLC) (2013–2018)
Jimmy Haslam, Dee Haslam, Peter H. Edwards Jr., and other investors (Columbus Partnership) (2018–present)

D.C. United
Washington Soccer, LP (1995–2000)
Anschutz Entertainment Group (2001–2006)
William Chang (D.C. United Holdings) (2006–2012)
William Chang, Erick Thohir and Jason Levien (2012–2018)
Jason Levien and Steven Kaplan (2018–present)
 
FC Cincinnati
Carl Lindner III, Chris Lindner, David L. Thompson, Jeff Berding, Scott Farmer, Steve Hightower, George Joseph, Mike Mossel, Jack Wyant (2018–present)
Meg Whitman, Griff Harsh (minority) (2019–present)

FC Dallas
Major League Soccer (1995–2001)
Lamar Hunt (2001–2006)
Clark Hunt (2006–present)

Houston Dynamo
Anschutz Entertainment Group (2005–2008)
Anschutz Entertainment Group, Oscar De La Hoya (through Golden Boy Promotions) and Gabriel Brener (2008–2015)
 Gabriel Brener, Oscar De La Hoya, Jake Silverstein, Ben Guill (2015–2021)
 James Harden became a member of this group in 2019, purchasing a 5% stake.
 Ted Segal (2021–present)

Inter Miami CF
David Beckham, Simon Fuller, Marcelo Claure, Jorge and José Mas, Masayoshi Son (2018–present)

LA Galaxy
L.A. Soccer Partners, LP (1995–1997)
Anschutz Entertainment Group (1998–present)

Los Angeles FC
 Peter Guber (Executive Chairman), Henry Nguyen, Tom Penn, Ruben Gnanalingam, Vincent Tan, Brandon Beck, Larry Berg, Will Ferrell, Nomar Garciaparra, Mia Hamm, Chad Hurley, Magic Johnson, Tucker Kain, Kirk Lacob, Mark Leschly, Mike Mahan, Irwin Raij, Tony Robbins, Lon Rosen, Bennett Rosenthal, Paul Schaeffer, Brandon Schneider, Mark Shapiro, Allen Shapiro, Jason Sugarman, Harry Tsao (2014–present)
Larry Berg, Brandon Beck, and Bennett Rosenthal are managing operators

Minnesota United FC
Bill McGuire, Jim Pohlad, Robert Pohlad, Glen Taylor, Wendy Carlson Nelson (2015–present)

CF Montréal
Joey Saputo (2010–present)

Nashville SC
John Ingram (2017–present)
 Mark Wilf, Zygi Wilf, Leonard Wilf (minority) (2020–2021)
 Derrick Henry, Jim Toth, Reese Witherspoon (minority) (2022–present)
 Antetokounmpo brothers (Giannis, Thanasis, Kostas, Alex), Filip Forsberg (minority) (2023–present)

New England Revolution
Robert Kraft and family (1995–present)

New York City FC
City Football Group (majority) and Yankee Global Enterprises (minority) (2013–present)

New York Red Bulls
John Kluge and Stuart Subotnick (1995–01)
Anschutz Entertainment Group (2001–06)
Red Bull GmbH (2006–present)

Orlando City SC
Flávio Augusto da Silva (2013–2021)
Mark Wilf, Zygi Wilf, Leonard Wilf (2021–present)

Philadelphia Union
Jay Sugarman (Keystone Sports & Entertainment, LLC) (2008–present)

Portland Timbers
Merritt Paulson (2009–present)

Real Salt Lake
Dave Checketts (SCP Worldwide) (2004–12)
Dell Loy Hansen (2012–2021)
David S. Blitzer and Ryan Smith (2022–present)

San Jose Earthquakes
Major League Soccer (1996–1998)
Robert Kraft (1999–2000)
Silicon Valley Sports & Entertainment (2001–2002)
Silicon Valley Sports & Entertainment and Anschutz Entertainment Group (2002–2003)
Anschutz Entertainment Group (2003–2005)
Lewis Wolff and John J. Fisher (Earthquakes Soccer, LLC) (2007–present)

Seattle Sounders FC
Joe Roth (2007–2015)
Adrian Hanauer, Paul Allen and Drew Carey (minority) 
Adrian Hanauer (2015–2018)
Paul Allen, Drew Carey and Joe Roth (minority) 
Adrian Hanauer (2018–2019)
Drew Carey, Joe Roth, and Estate of Paul Allen (minority) 
Adrian Hanauer, Jody Allen, Drew Carey, Peter Tomozawa, Terry Myerson and Katie Myerson, Russell Wilson and Ciara, Macklemore and Tricia Davis, Satya Nadella and Anu Nadella, Amy Hood and Max Kleinman, Joe Belfiore and Kristina Belfiore, S. Somasegar and Akila Somasegar, Chee Chew and Christine Chew, David Nathanson and Sabina Nathanson, Brian McAndrews and Elise Holschuh, Mark Agne and Tomoko Agne (2019–present)
Tod Leiweke and Tara Leiweke and Ken Griffey Jr. and Melissa Griffey were added in 2020.

Sporting Kansas City
Lamar Hunt (1995–2006)
Sporting Club (2006–present) 

St. Louis City SC
The Taylor family led by Carolyn Kindle (2023-present)
Jim Kavanaugh (2023-present)

Toronto FC
Maple Leaf Sports & Entertainment (2006–present)

Vancouver Whitecaps FC
Greg Kerfoot, Steve Luczo, Jeff Mallett and Steve Nash (2009–present)

Future MLS teams

List of defunct MLS teams
Chivas USA
Jorge Vergara and Antonio Cué Sánchez-Navarro (2004–2012)
Jorge Vergara (2012–2014)
Major League Soccer (2014)

Miami Fusion
 Ken Horowitz (1997–2001)

Tampa Bay Mutiny
 Major League Soccer (1995–2001)

See also
 List of professional sports team owners

References